Wickholm is a Norwegian surname. Notable people with the surname include:

Jani Wickholm (born 1977), Finnish singer
Truls Wickholm (born 1978), Norwegian politician
Valdemar Wickholm (1890–1970), Finnish track and field athlete

Norwegian-language surnames